New York Star may refer to:

 New York Star (1800s newspaper), a New York City newspaper from about 1868 to 1891, published by Joe Howard, Jr. and later William Dorsheimer
 New York Star (1908–1936), a theatrical weekly tabloid, Roland Burke Hennessy, editor
 New York Star (1948–1949), a newspaper that lasted from 1948 and 1949, successor to PM
 New York Star, a fictional newspaper in the television show Sex and the City

See also
 New York Stars (disambiguation)